Middle management is the intermediate management level of a hierarchical organization that is subordinate to the executive management and responsible for ‘team leading’ line managers and/or ‘specialist’ line managers. Middle management is indirectly (through line management) responsible for junior staff performance and productivity.

Unlike line management, middle management is considered to be a senior (or semi-executive) position as middle managers are authorised to speak and act on behalf of the organisation to line managers, junior staff and customers. In this level of management are included division, plant and department managers.

Role in an organization

Functions of a middle manager
A middle manager is a link between the senior management and the lower (junior) levels of the organization. Due to involvement into day-to-day running of a business, middle managers have the opportunity to report valuable information and suggestions from the inside of an organization. They are in charge of putting into practice guidelines established previously in the strategic plans by top level managers.  Moreover, the middle manager is a channel of communication within the organization, as they pass on major decisions of executives and the main goals of an organization to lower levels of employees. This contributes to better coordination between workers and makes a company more united.

The primary responsibility of a middle manager is to implement a strategy, created by the executive level, in the most efficient way possible. In order to reach the target goals, a manager may adjust and interpret the initial plan. Other functions can be divided into three main categories:
 Technical
Middle managers are in charge of facilitating any changes needed in an organization and creating an effective working environment. They administer day-to-day routines, monitors performance and make sure everything is done in compliance with organization's needs.
 Human resources
One of the most important functions of a middle manager is motivating, leading and inspiring their subordinates. This also includes building a team and supporting any team member when necessary. 
 Strategic
Strategic functions involve analyzing a subordinate group in terms of productivity and financial effectiveness, creating a strategy of improving the current situation and reporting to the executive management in the form of attending a boardroom meeting or a discussion.

Competencies
A number of competencies are critical to become an effective middle manager.
 Leadership. The most important competency that consists of many skills. As an inherent leader, middle managers have to possess sense-making and persuading skills. They must be able to motivate, influence and guide their subordinates, become a role model for them, demonstrate the quality and the level of work contribution necessary for the organization and engage in continuous self-development and learning.
 Decision-making. Ability to quickly solve the problems, make decisions under pressure and take responsibility for the outcome.
 Creativity & Visioning. Managers should have a clear vision of the strategy implementation and be creative in overcoming the possible difficulties.
 Performance management. Involves managing the performance of subordinates and, specifically, the line managers, effectively, by setting clear and measurable objectives for them and provide coaching. Middle managers must be also skilled in presenting, persuading and influencing people.

Middle manager vs. line manager
A middle management position is often mistakenly described as a similar to the line management one. However, there are some differences:
  Middle manager is a semi-executive position – line managers are promoted to become middle managers. Thus, middle managers enjoy greater salary, benefits and a closer position to a boardroom.
 System of subordination – line managers are subordinate to middle managers. Middle managers are responsible for large teams and are unable to control performance of every single individual. Thus, direct or line manager measures the team performance and reports to the middle manager.
 Set of duties – unlike line managers, who have a clear procedure of work and set of duties, middle managers have only target goals. The way of achieving those goals is decided by the manager independently.

Criticism
The role of middle management is subjected to a number of criticisms. This position is often seen as unnecessary and middle managers are blamed for holding back the organization from achieving its full potential and using the influence for their own purposes.

Influence
Middle management is often accused of possessing too much influence. Their centric position in an organization allows to influence strategy and actions in "both upward and downward direction". When supplying information to the executive level, middle managers interpret it subjectively and may insinuate it with their own opinion and evaluation. Further, proximity to the boardroom makes it easy for the manager to promote their own interests, by "synthesizing" the information and presenting data from a certain strategic perspective. The same level of influence can be exploited by a middle manager towards the lower staff. Driven by the reasons of maintaining a reputation, strengthening the power and influence, middle manager may introduce company's major strategic decisions in a light, beneficial way for their designs.

Resistance
Middle managers' reluctance to lose control in their teams and satisfaction with a settled situation could lead to their resistance in any changes in the strategy or direction of an organization. Usually, the resistance does not take an aggressive form such as refusal to carry out tasks or unconcealed confrontation, but result in a lack of support and eagerness to convey only those tasks, impact of which is clearly visible to the top management. This creates barriers to a growth of a company and lags the overall working process.

Necessity
The overall necessity of middle managers in an organization is questioned. They are said to be too costly, non-effective and constantly underperforming employees. It has been stated that middle managers do not carry out their main duties of linking the organization and reporting effectively, which leads to a block of communication between different levels of staff. Thus, as rapid growth of globalization put pressures on businesses in terms of cost effectiveness and speed of information flow within the organization, middle management make companies less flexible and competitive.

Future
Development of information technology enabled an increase in the span of control and reduced the need for middle management. Moreover, an increasingly big number of modern organizations become flatter and downsized in the pursuit of flexibility, higher competitiveness and innovation. According to David Williams, flat organizations promote greater intercommunication and efficiency of the workers. As a result, many organizations are being restructured, middle management is being reduced and their roles are thought to be out-dated and unnecessary.

At the same time, there is still a need in a middle manager as an employee and they continue playing a significant role in organizations, specifically in setting an overall strategy and targets. Changes in the global market forced them to become more flexible, stress-resistant, acquire new skills.

References

External links
 
 Freek Hermkens (3 June 2020) Middle managers are key for lean change in financial services

Management occupations